Nana Gecaga (born 1978), is a Kenyan businesswoman and corporate executive, who served as the CEO of the Kenyatta International Convention Centre (KICC), from April 1st 2016 to December 29th 2022. 
KICC is a building owned by the government of Kenya, which hosts conferences, concerts and exhibitions.

Background and education
She was born in Kenya in March 1978 to Jeni Wambui, a daughter to Jomo Kenyatta, the first president of Kenya (1964–1978), and Udi Gecaga, son of Jemimah Gecaga. Nana is a niece to Uhuru Kenyatta, the President of Kenya (2013–2022). She holds a bachelor's degree in marketing obtained from the American InterContinental University in London, United Kingdom. The London campus of American InterContinental University was founded in 1978 and re-branded to Regent's University London in 2013.

Career
Gecaga works primarily in international marketing and tourism. She is credited with being partly responsible for Kenya's successful bid to host the 2009 MTV Africa Music Awards.

She has previously worked as the Head of Marketing at KICC. Following that, she was employed as Marketing and Special Programmes Advisor to the Cabinet Secretary, Kenya Ministry of Tourism.

Effective 1 April 2016, Najib Balala, the Tourism Cabinet Secretary appointed Nana Gecaga as the acting Managing Director of the Kenyatta International Convention Centre, pending the selection of a substantive CEO.

Other considerations
Nana Gecaga is a single mother of three children. In July 2018, she was elected deputy chairperson of the African chapter of the International Congress and Convention Association (ICCA). She is a recovering alcoholic, who has been sober since 1999.

See also
 Susan Oguya
 Iddah Asin
 Sylvia Mulinge

References

External links
Billionaire's Club: Uhuru's niece Nana Gecaga blows millions on 40th birthday As of April 2018.

Living people
1978 births
Kikuyu people
21st-century Kenyan businesswomen
21st-century Kenyan businesspeople
People from Nairobi
American InterContinental University alumni
Kenyan chief executives
Kenyan women business executives